Chuxian County is a county in Anhui, China.

County-level divisions of Anhui
Suzhou, Anhui